Advice from a Caterpillar is a 1999 independent drama film directed by Don Scardino and adapted by Douglas Carter Beane from his play of the same name. The title is derived from chapter five of the classic children's novel Alice's Adventures in Wonderland, by Lewis Carroll.

Premise
Nixon plays a video artist with an aversion to commitment. She nonetheless falls for a bisexual actor (Olyphant) who is involved with her best friend (Dick).

Cast
 Cynthia Nixon 
 Timothy Olyphant
 Andy Dick
 Ally Sheedy 
 Jon Tenney

References

External links

1999 films
1999 drama films
American drama films
1999 LGBT-related films
American LGBT-related films
LGBT-related drama films
Films directed by Don Scardino
1990s English-language films
1990s American films